Steve Kingue (born 23 January 2000) is a Cameroonian football player who plays for 1. FK Příbram.

References

External links 
 

2000 births
Living people
Cameroonian footballers
Cameroonian expatriate footballers
JK Tallinna Kalev players
Philadelphia Union II players
Association football defenders
USL Championship players
Expatriate footballers in Estonia